Alanya Alaaddin Keykubat University is a state university located in Alanya, Turkey. The university was founded in 2015 by the Grand National Assembly of Turkey and is named after Kayqubad I.

References 

Educational institutions established in 2015
2015 establishments in Turkey
State universities and colleges in Turkey